Sathi Leelavathi is a 1995 Indian Tamil-language comedy film directed, co-written, photographed and edited by Balu Mahendra. The film stars Ramesh Aravind, Kalpana and Heera, with Kovai Sarala and Kamal Haasan in supporting roles. It revolves around Arun (Aravind) who, unhappy with his wife Leelavathi's (Kalpana) plain looks and weight, engages in an extramarital affair with Priya (Heera).

The film was produced by Haasan, with the story by Ananthu adapted loosely from the 1989 American film She-Devil and dialogues by Crazy Mohan. Ilaiyaraaja served as the music composer. Sathi Leelavathi was released on 15 January 1995 and became a commercial success. It was remade in Hindi as Biwi No.1 (1999) and in Kannada as Rama Shama Bhama (2005) with Aravind and Haasan reprising their roles.

Plot

Arunachalam alias Arun is married to Leelavathi alias Leela in a forced marriage. He is embarrassed by his wife's plain looks and weight. When he meets Priya, who works in a building construction company, he hides from her the fact that he is married and has an affair with her.

When he takes Priya with him on a vacation to Bangalore, he bumps into his old friend Sakthivel Gounder, an orthopaedic surgeon from Coimbatore who is also in Bangalore with his wife Palani and his son Anand travelling with him in the same flight and even staying in the same hotel. Sakthivel is called to Arun's room in the night as Arun has slipped his disc and the hotel doctor is unavailable, and bumps into Priya, thus finding out about the affair.

After returning to Chennai, Priya finds out that Arun is married, but decides to continue with him when Arun says he was forced into marriage and promises to divorce his wife. When Arun's wife Leelavathi discovers Arun's affair, she has a huge showdown which leads to Arun leaving the house. Then, Leelavathi plans a series of dramas which makes Priya hate Arun. She does this with the help of Sakthivel, her father-in-law, children and Priya's old lover Raja. Finally Priya unites with Raja apologising to him and Arun unites with Leelavathi.

Cast 

 Ramesh Aravind as Arunachalam "Arun"
 Kalpana as Leelavathi "Leela"
 Heera as Priyadarshini "Priya"
 Kovai Sarala as Palaniammal Sakthivel Gounder
 Chokkalinga Bhagavathar as Arun's father
 Raja as Raja (Guest appearance)
 Ra. Sankaran as Leela's father
 Veeraraghavan as Veeraraghavan
 Janaki as Leela's mother
 Madhan Bob as Leelavathi's brother
 Krishnan as Hotel staff
 Vatsala Rajagopal as Ambujam Maami
 Lalitha as Bhagyalakshmi
 Master Anand as Sakthivel's son
 Baby Monisha as Ammulu
 Master Nadhim as Aravind
 Kamal Haasan as Dr. Sakthivel Gounder

Production
The initial plot of Sathi Leelavathi revolved around two men fighting over a woman, with one of the them being the antagonist. Raja, who had grown weary of being typecast in "soft" roles, readily accepted Balu Mahendra's offer to portray the antagonist to break the stereotype, but deep into pre-production, Kamal Haasan felt this premise had been "done-to-death", and according to Raja, "From a bad guy, I became the extreme good guy". Jayaram was initially offered the lead role but his unavailability meant that the team finalised Ramesh Aravind. Kovai Sarala was signed to portray the role of Palani after great debate. While Haasan wanted her in the film, Mahendra was hesitant. Haasan waited for Sarala for six months and brought her on board the film. Sarala later said that Mahendra was delighted that she was part of the film and that he felt bad for initially having doubts in her ability. Haasan speaks Kongu Tamil in the film, which he was said to have learned from Sarala. The film was loosely inspired by 1989 American film She-Devil, but does not depict the female lead trying to establish her own identity at the cost of her husband's.

Soundtrack
The music was composed by Ilaiyaraaja, with lyrics by Vaali. The song "Marugo Marugo" pays homage to the song of the same name from Vettri Vizhaa (1989).

Release and reception 
Sathi Leelavathi was released on 15 January 1995, the week of Pongal. R.P.R. of Kalki criticised the story's lack of originality, but lauded Mohan's dialogues and Haasan's humour-based performance. The film was a success, which Haasan attributed in large part to Sarala's comedy. She won the Tamil Nadu State Film Award for Best Comedian.

Remakes 
Sathi Leelavathi was dubbed in Telugu under the same title, with Haasan' voice dubbed by Mano instead of the usual S. P. Balasubrahmanyam. It was remade in Hindi as Biwi No.1 (1999), and in Kannada as Rama Shama Bhama (2005) with Aravind and Haasan reprising their roles.

References

Bibliography

External links 
 
 

1990s Tamil-language films
1995 comedy films
1995 films
Films about adultery in India
Films directed by Balu Mahendra
Films scored by Ilaiyaraaja
Films set in Bangalore
Films with screenplays by Crazy Mohan
Indian comedy films
Tamil films remade in other languages